A jack-in-the-box is a children's toy that outwardly consists of a box with a crank. When the crank is turned, a music box mechanism in the toy plays a melody. After the crank has been turned a sufficient number of times (such as at the end of the melody), the lid pops open and a figure, usually a clown or jester, pops out of the box. Some jacks-in-the-box open at random times when cranked, making the startle even more effective. Many of those that use "Pop Goes the Weasel" open at the point in the melody when the word "pop" would be sung. In 2005, the jack-in-the-box was inducted into the U.S. National Toy Hall of Fame, where are displayed all types of versions of the toy, starting from the beginning versions, and ending with the most recently manufactured versions.

Origin
A theory as to the origin of the jack-in-the-box is that it comes from the 14th-century English prelate Sir John Schorne, who is often pictured holding a boot with a devil in it. According to folklore, he once cast the devil into a boot to protect the village of North Marston in Buckinghamshire. In French, a jack-in-the-box is called a "diable en boîte" (literally "devil in a box").  The phrase jack-in-the-box was first seen used in literature by John Foxe, in his book Actes and Monuments., first published in 1563. There he used the term as an insult to describe a swindler who would cheat tradesmen by selling them empty boxes instead of what they actually purchased.

History 
In the early 1500s, the first jack-in-the-box was made by a German clockmaker known as Claus. Claus built a wooden box, with metal edges and a handle that would pop out an animated devil or “Jack” after cranking the handle. It was built as a gift for a local prince's fifth birthday. After seeing this toy, other nobles requested their own "Devils-in-a-box" for their children.

In the early 18th century, improved toy mechanisms made the jack-in-the-box more widely available for all children and not just royalty.

Models 
Originally, the jack-in-the-box was made out of wood, but with new technology the toy could be constructed from printed cardboard. Around the 1930s, the jack-in-the-box became a wind-up toy made from tin. Additionally, the tin boxes began to be covered in images from children's nursery rhymes with corresponding tunes. Over the years, the jack-in-the-box has evolved into characters other than the clown, such as Winnie the Pooh, The Cat in the Hat, the Three Little Pigs, kittens, dogs, Curious George, Santa Claus, giraffe, and so on.

Distributors 
Starting in 1935 and continuing for 20 years, the first company to take on the distribution of the toy was a very small firm named Joy Toy. The company is located in Italy as well as the Netherlands. Since then, Fisher Price, Chad Valley, Mattel and Tomy have all played a major role in distributing the jack-in-the-box.

In popular culture 
The jack-in-the-box has been used for centuries by cartoonists as a way to describe and poke fun at politicians. 
The American fast food company Jack in the Box began using the toy and the phrase as their mascot in the early 1950s.

A 1945 Disney cartoon called The Clock Watcher shows Donald Duck playing with a Jack-in-the-box.  He makes many failed attempts to close it, and it slides Donald across the table, hitting Donald's head into his pie piece. Finally, he hammers the box with a mallet only for Jack to break through the floor, Donald struggles to pull him out but ends up trapped in the box, wrestling with him until he gets free, but switches clothes with the toy stealing his shirt and hat while Donald is wearing Jack's hat and accordion clown costume. 

The comic book series Astro City, written by Kurt Busiek and illustrated by Alex Ross, features a wisecracking vigilante named "Jack-In-The-Box", who relies on toy-themed gadgets while using the typical clown motif.

References

External links

Traditional toys
Toy instruments and noisemakers